The southern African spiny mouse (Acomys spinosissimus)  is a species of rodent in the family Muridae. It is found in Botswana, Democratic Republic of the Congo, Malawi, Mozambique, South Africa, Tanzania, Zambia, and Zimbabwe.
Its natural habitats are moist savanna and rocky areas.

References

Acomys
Rodents of Africa
Mammals described in 1852
Taxonomy articles created by Polbot
Taxa named by Wilhelm Peters